Gavdul (also Romanized as Gāvdūl and Gāv Dūl) is a village in Zardalan Rural District, Holeylan County, Ilam Province, Iran. At the 2006 census, its population was 80, in 18 families. The village is populated by Kurds.

References 

Populated places in Chardavol County
Kurdish settlements in Ilam Province